Gilbert Elliott (December 10, 1843 – May 9, 1895) was builder of the ironclad ram CSS Albemarle.

Family
Elliott's parents were Gilbert Elliott (May 20, 1813 – May 20, 1851) and Sarah Ann Grice (June 1, 1819 – April 22, 1891), granddaughter of shipbuilder Charles Grice and Mary Grandy. 
He was born at "Milford" estate in Camden County, North Carolina.
After his mother became a widow she moved to Oxford, North Carolina, and became the author of a cookbook, "Mrs. Elliott's Housewife", published in New York in 1870.

Education
Elliott was educated in the local schools of Elizabeth City, North Carolina.  He was a law clerk by 1860.

Military career
He probably enlisted in the Confederate Army on May 16, 1862 at Camp Mangum in North Carolina, the next day he was appointed First Lieutenant and given duty of Regimental Adjutant.

CSS Albemarle
Construction of the Confederate ironclad CSS Albemarle began in 1862 in a former cornfield in Halifax County, North Carolina.

References
Elliott, Robert G., Ironclad of the Roanoke, White Mane Publishing, 1994, 

1843 births
1895 deaths
People of North Carolina in the American Civil War
Confederate States Army officers
American shipbuilders
People from Camden County, North Carolina